Brutalism is an architectural style that spawned from the modernist architectural movement and which flourished from the 1950s to the 1970s. The following list provides numerous examples of this architectural style worldwide.

Africa

Côte d'Ivoire 

 La Pyramide (building), Abidjan (1973)

Kenya 

 Kenyatta International Convention Centre, Nairobi (1973)

South Africa 
Brixton Tower, Johannesburg (1962)
Joburg Theatre, Johannesburg (1962)
Johannesburg Central Police Station, Johannesburg (1968)
Hillbrow Tower, Johannesburg (1968)
Ponte Tower, Johannesburg (1975)
Auckland Park Campus, University of Johannesburg (1975)

Asia

Bangladesh 
 Jatiyo Sangshad Bhaban (Dhaka National Assembly), Dhaka, Louis Kahn, (1982)

Georgia 
 Bank of Georgia headquarters, Tbilisi, (1975)

Iraq 
 Al Zaqura Building, Baghdad, (1975)

Israel 
 Tel Aviv-Yafo City Hall, Tel Aviv-Yafo, Menachem Cohen, (1956–1964)
 Basilica of the Annunciation, Nazareth, Giovanni Muzio, (1960–1969)
 Mivtachim Sanitarium, Zikhron Ya'akov, Yaakov Rechter, (1966)
 The Humanities Building, Ben-Gurion University of the Negev, Raffi Ripper, Amnon Niv, Natan Magen, (1968)
 Carlton Tel Aviv, (1977)
 Hecht Synagogue, Jerusalem, (Ram Karmi (1981)

India 
 Secretariat Building, Chandigarh, Le Corbusier, (1953)
 Tagore Memorial Hall, Ahmedabad, B. V. Doshi, (1971)

Japan 
 Tower House, Tokyo, Takamitsu Azuma, (1967)

Lebanon 
 The Egg, also known as "The Dome" and "the Soap," Beirut, Joseph Philippe Karam, (1968)

Russia 
 RIA Novosti headquarter, former press-center of 1980 Summer Olympics, Moscow, (1976–1979)
 TASS building, Moscow, V. S. Egerev, (1977)
 House of Soviets (Kaliningrad), (1985)

Singapore 
 Singapore Power Building, Singapore, Group 2 Architects, (1971)

Americas

Argentina 
Buenos Aires
 Chacarita Cemetery Subterranean / Sixth Pantheon, Buenos Aires, (1950-1958)
 Republica Building, Buenos Aires, (1951-1954)
 Santa Maria de Betania Parish, Buenos Aires, (1954)
 Santa Catalina de Alejandria Church, Buenos Aires, (1957-1968)
 Banco de Londres building, Buenos Aires, Clorindo Testa, (1959)
 University Campus / Pavilion II, Buenos Aires, (1961)
 Della Penna School, Buenos Aires, (1963-1969)
 Argentine Automobile Club - Once, Buenos Aires, (1968)
 Argentine Automobile Club - Palermo, Buenos Aires, (1968)
 Telefónica Inclán, Buenos Aires, (1968)
 Dorrego Tower, Buenos Aires, (1968-1971)
 Nuestra Señora del Valle Parish, Buenos Aires, (1969)
 Acoyte Complex, Buenos Aires, (1969)
 Rioja Complex, Buenos Aires, (1969-1973)
 Institute of the Argentine Federal Police, Buenos Aires, (1974)
 Castex Tower, Buenos Aires, (1975-1985)
 Parking Marcelo T. De Alvear 686, Buenos Aires, (1970s)
 Arribeños 1630, Buenos Aires, (1970s)
 Arribeños 1684, Buenos Aires, (1970s)
 San Pauls School, Buenos Aires, (1970s)
 Normal High School No.1, Buenos Aires, (1970s)
 Rodriguez Peña 2043 Building, Buenos Aires, (1975-1978)
 Colpayo 54/56, Buenos Aires, (1978)
 River Plate Monumental Stadium, Buenos Aires, (1978-1982)
 Brazilian Embassy, Buenos Aires, (1978-1989)
 National Library of the Argentine Republic, Buenos Aires, Clorindo Testa, (1992)
Córdoba
 Alas Complex, Córdoba, (1974)
La Plata
 Teatro Argentino de La Plata, La Plata, (1999)

Brazil 
 São Paulo Metro, São Paulo, (1974-1980)

Canada 
 University of Toronto Scarborough, Humanities Wing, Toronto, John Andrews, (1964)
 University of Toronto Scarborough, Science Wing, Toronto, John Andrews, (1964)
 Rochdale College, Toronto, Elmar Tampõld & John Wells, (1968)
 Mathematics and Computer Building, University of Waterloo, Ontario, (1968)
 Environment Canada, MSC Headquarters, Toronto, (1971)
 John P. Robarts Research Library, Toronto, A.S. Mathers & E.J. Haldenby, (1973)
 Walter Carsen Centre, Toronto, Arthur Erickson, (1984)
 National Arts Centre, Ottawa, (1969)
 Simon Fraser University – Burnaby Campus, Burnaby, British Columbia, Arthur Erickson, (1965)
Killam Memorial Library, Dalhousie University, Halifax, Nova Scotia, Leslie R. Fairn, (1966–71)
 Craigdarroch Residences, University of Victoria, Victoria, British Columbia, (1964–67)
 Habitat 67, 1967 World's Fair, Montreal, Quebec, Moshe Safdie, (1967)
 Place Bonaventure, Montreal, Quebec, Ray Affleck, (1967)
 Former Centennial Planetarium, Calgary, McMillan Long & Associates, (1967)
 Landsdown Residences, University of Victoria, Victoria, (1969)
 Education Centre Building, Calgary, Alberta, (1969)
 Main Library, University of Saskatchewan, Saskatoon, (1970)
 Education Building, University of Saskatchewan, Saskatoon, (1970)
 Health Sciences Building, University of Saskatchewan, Saskatoon, (1970)
 404 Sixth Avenue SW, Calgary, Alberta, (1970)
 Fenwick Tower, Halifax, Nova Scotia, Sydney P. Dumaresq, (1971)
 Édifice Marie-Guyart, Québec City, (1972)
 D. B. Weldon Library, University of Western Ontario, London, Ontario, (1972)
 Lester B. Pearson Building, Ottawa, (1973)
 Centennial Concert Hall, Winnipeg, Manitoba (1968)
 Public Safety Building, Winnipeg, Manitoba (Libling Michener & Associates, 1965)
 Manitoba Theatre Centre, Winnipeg, Manitoba (Number Ten Architectural Group, 1972)
 University of Guelph – South Residence, Guelph, Ontario (John Andrews, 1965)

Chile 
 National Congress of Chile, Valparaiso, (1990)

Cuba 
 Embassy of the United States, Havana, (1953)

Mexico 
 Museo Tamayo Arte Contemporáneo, Mexico City, Abraham Zabludovsky and Teodoro González de León, (1981)

United States

Venezuela 
 Teresa Carreño Cultural Complex, Venezuela (1983)

Europe

Belgium 
 CBR Building, Watermael-Boitsfort, Brussels (Constantin Brodzki, 1970)

Bulgaria 

 Festivalna (Felatival) Hall (1968), Sofia;
 Sofia Hall (1968), Sofia;
 Diplomatic Blocs (1973), Joliot Curie str., Sofia;
 Sofia Central Station, Sofia, Bulgaria (1974)
 Kambanite Monument (1979), Sofia;
 National Palace of Culture (1981), Sofia
 Buzludzha Monument, Balkan Mountains, Bulgaria (1981)
 Monument to 1300 Years of Bulgaria, Shumen (1981)
 Large aviary, bear area and other structures at the Sofia Zoo (1982);
 Sports complex "Cherveno zname” (Red Flag) (1985)
 Building 2 (“The Transistor”) of the International House of the Journalists, Varna.

Denmark 
 Hans Christian Ørsted Institute, Copenhagen, Denmark, (Eva Koppel, 1955–1962)
 Technical University of Denmark, Kongens Lyngby, Denmark, (Eva Koppel, 1961–1975)
 Panum Institute, Copenhagen, Denmark (Eva Koppel, 1966–1986)

Estonia 
 Linnahall, Tallinn, Estonia (Raine Karp, Riina Altmäe, 1975-1980)
 National Library of Estonia, Tallinn, Estonia (Raine Karp, 1985-1993)

France 
 Unité d'Habitation de Marseille (Cité Radieuse), Marseille, France (Le Corbusier, 1952)
 Maisons Jaoul, Neuilly-sur-Seine, France (Le Corbusier, 1954–1956)
 Sainte Marie de La Tourette, Lyon, France (Le Corbusier and Iannis Xenakis, 1960)
 Flaine, France. (Designed by Marcel Breuer, the entire assembly of hotels, shops, apartment blocks and administrative buildings of Flaine-Forum comprise a themed but varied entity), completed 1969
 Centre National de la Danse, Pantin (1972)
 Auditorium Maurice-Ravel, Lyon, France (1975)

Germany 
 Ruhr University Bochum, Germany (Hentrich, Petschnigg & Partner, 1964)
 University of Regensburg, Regensburg, Germany (1965)
 AfE-Turm, Frankfurt am Main, Germany (Staatliches Universitätsbauamt, Staatliche Neubauleitung Frankfurt, 1972) (demolished 2014)
 Friedenskirche, Monheim-Baumberg, Germany (1974)
 Main building of the University of Bielefeld, Bielefeld University, Bielefeld, Germany (1971-1976)
 Embassy of People's Republic of Czechoslovakia in Berlin, Germany (Věra and Vladimír Machonin, 1978)

Greece 
 Broadcasting House (the headquarters of the Hellenic Broadcasting Corporation), Athens, Greece (1969)
 Porto Carras Resort, Chalkidiki, Greece (Walter Gropius, posthum built 1973)
 School of Theology, National and Kapodistrian University of Athens, Greece, L. Kalivites and G. Leonardos, 1976

Ireland 
 Central Plaza, Dublin. Originally the Central Bank of Ireland Building (1978)

Italy 
 Torre Velasca, Milan, Italy, (BBPR group 1954)
 Hotel DUPARC Contemporary Suites, Turin, Italy (Laura Petrazzini, 1971)
 British Embassy, Rome, Italy, (Basil Spence, 1968)

Lituania 
 Seimas Palace (1980)

Moldova 
 Moldova National Opera Ballet, Chișinău, Moldova (1980)
 Moldova Presidential Residence, Chișinău, Moldova (1987)

Poland 

 Supersam Warsaw, Poland (1962)
 Młotek, 8 Smolna Street in Warsaw, Poland (1964, by Jan Bogusławski, Bohdan Gniewiewski)
 Bunkier Sztuki, Kraków, Poland (Krystyna Tołłoczko-Różyska, Antoni Hajdecki, 1965)
 Mausoleum of the Majdanek concentration camp, Poland (Wiktor Tołkin, Janusz Dembek, 1969)
 Spodek, Katowice, Poland (1971)
 Katowice railway station, Katowice, Poland (Wacław Kłyszewski, Jerzy Mokrzyński and Eugeniusz Wierzbicki a.k.a. "The Tigers", 1972)
 Hala Olivia, Gdańsk, Poland (1972)
 Forum Hotel, Kraków, Poland (Janusz Ingarden, 1978–1989)
 Church of the Exaltation of the Holy Cross and Our Lady of Health of the Sick in Katowice, Poland (Henryk Buszko, Aleksander Franta, (1991)

Portugal 
 Palace of Justice, Lisbon, Portugal (Januário Godinho and João Andresen, 1970)
 Casino Park Hotel, Funchal, Portugal (Oscar Niemeyer and Viana de Lima, 1976)

Romania 
 Administrative Palace, Satu Mare, Romania (Nicolae Porumbescu, 1984)

Serbia 
 Novobeogradski blokovi (Blocks 22, 23, 28, 30, 61, 62, 63), Belgrade, Serbia (1948-1990)
 Museum of Yugoslavia, Belgrade, Serbia (1962)
 Toblerone building, Belgrade, Serbia (1963)
 Avala Tower, Belgrade, Serbia (1965; 2009)
 New Belgrade town hall, Belgrade, Serbia (1967)
 25 May Sportcenter, Belgrade, Serbia (1975)
 Eastern City Gate, Belgrade, Serbia (1976)
 County Court, Požarevac, Serbia (1976)
 Western City Gate, Belgrade, Serbia (1977)
 County Court, Sremska Mitrovica (1979)
 Zlatibor Hotel, Užice, Serbia (1981)

Spain 
 Torres Blancas, Madrid, Spain (1968)
 Facultades de Ciencias Biológicas y Geológicas (Universidad Complutense de Madrid), Madrid (Francisco Fernández Longoria, 1965-1968)
 Walden 7 building, Sant Just Desvern - Barcelona, Spain (Ricardo Bofill, 1975)
 Facultad de Ciencias de la Información (Universidad Complutense de Madrid), Madrid, (José María Laguna Martínez and Juan Castañón Fariña, 1979)

Sweden 
 Villa Göth, Uppsala, Sweden (Bengt Edman and Lennart Holm, 1950)

Switzerland 
 Therme Vals Spa Building, Vals, Switzerland (Peter Zumthor, 1993–1996)

United Kingdom

England 
Many of the notable surviving brutalist buildings in England are listed on the National Heritage List for England. Inclusion on the list is based on a building's "special architectural and historic interest", with "particularly careful selection required" for buildings constructed after 1945 (i.e. all brutalist structures). There are three grades of listed building: grade I for buildings "of exceptional interest", grade II* for "particularly important buildings of more than special interest" and grade II for buildings "of special interest".  Buildings may also be granted a certificate of immunity from listing for a period of five years, allowing a building to be developed or demolished in the knowledge that it will not be subject to listing in that period. A certificate of immunity was issued for the Robin Hood Gardens Estate in 2009 and then again in 2015, prior to its demolition in 2017, after Historic England determined that it "[did] not meet the very high threshold for listing".

 Smithdon High School, Norfolk, Peter and Alison Smithson (1950–54); grade II* listed
 Department of Architecture extension, University of Cambridge, Colin St John Wilson and Alex Hardy with participation by students at the university (1959); grade II listed
 Park Hill, Sheffield, Ivor Smith & Jack Lynn (1957–60); grade II* listed
 The Beehives, St John's College, Oxford, Michael Powers of Architects' Co-Partnership (1958–60); grade II listed
 Crescent House Golden Lane Estate, London, Chamberlin, Powell and Bon (1958–62); grade II* listed
 Falmer House, University of Sussex, Basil Spence (1960–62); grade I listed
 Kingsgate Bridge, Durham, Ove Arup (1963); grade I listed

 St Aidan's College, Durham, Sir Basil Spence (1960–1964)
 Birmingham New Street Signal Box, Birmingham, Bicknell & Hamilton (1964); grade II listed
 Tricorn Centre, Portsmouth, Owen Luder (1964); Demolished in 2004
 Piccadilly Plaza, Manchester, Covell Matthews and Partners (1959–1965)
 Dunelm House, Durham Students' Union, Richard Raines of Architects' Co-Partnership (1964–66); grade II listed
 Buckinghamshire County Hall, Aylesbury, Frederick B. Pooley (1966)
 New County Hall, Truro, Francis Kenneth Hicklin & Alan J. Groves (1966); grade II listed
 Denys Wilkinson Building, Oxford, Philip Dowson (1967)
 Balfron Tower, London, Ernő Goldfinger (1965–1967); grade II* listed
 Stoke Newington School, Hackney, Stillman & Eastwick-Field Partnership (1967)
 Brunel University Lecture Centre, Uxbridge, Richard Sheppard, Robson and Partners (1965–66); grade II listed
 Churchill College, Cambridge, Sheppard Robson and Partners (1961–1968); grade II listed
 The 'ziggurats' at the University of East Anglia, Norwich, Sir Denys Lasdun (1964–68); grade II* listed
 The central hall and surrounding colleges at the University of York, Robert Matthew, Johnson-Marshall & Partners (1962–68); all grade II listed
 University of Essex, Main campus complex, Architects Co-Partnership (1964-1968)
 Queen Elizabeth Hall, Purcell Room and Hayward Gallery, London, Hubert Bennett & Jack Whittle (1967–68); certificate of immunity from listing issued 2020
 Mathematics Tower, Manchester, Scherrer & Hicks (1968); Demolished in 2005
 Finsbury Estate, London (1968)
 Garden building, St Hilda's College, Oxford, Alison and Peter Smithson (1968); grade II listed
 Middleton Grange Shopping Centre, Hartlepool (1969)
 Preston bus station, Preston, Keith Ingham & Charles Wilson (1968-1969); grade II listed

 The Trinity Centre Multi-Storey Car Park,  The Get Carter Carpark, Gateshead, Owen Luder (1964–1969); Demolished in 2010
 Tyne Bridge Tower, Gateshead (1960s); Demolished in 2010
 Pimlico School, London, John Bancroft (1967–1970); Demolished in 2010
 Leeds International Pool, Leeds, John Poulson (1970); Demolished in 2009
 Hyde Park Barracks, London, Sir Basil Spence (1970); listing refused 2015
 High Point, Bradford, John Brunton Partnership (1972)
 Trellick Tower, London, Ernő Goldfinger (1968–1972); grade II* listed
 Blackheath Quaker Meeting House, London, Trevor Dannatt (1971-72); grade II listed
 Robin Hood Gardens, London, Peter & Alison Smithson (1972); Demolished in 2017
 Westgate House, Newcastle Upon Tyne, Tyne & Wear (1972); Demolished in 2007
 School of Oriental and African Studies Philips Building, London, Sir Denys Lasdun (1973); grade II* listed
 Clifton Cathedral, Bristol, Ronald Weeks, E S Jennett and Antoni Poremba of the Percy Thomas Partnership (1969–1973); grade II* listed
 Titan House, The Northern School of Art, Hartlepool (1974)
 Birmingham Central Library, Birmingham, John Madin (1974); Demolished in 2015
 Grenfell Tower, London (1974); Currently shrouded post fire, awaiting outcome of investigation
 New Hall Place, Liverpool (1974)
 Guy's Hospital Tower, Southwark, London, Watkins Gray (1974)
 The Barbican Estate, London, Chamberlin, Powell and Bon (1964–1975); grade II listed
 50 Queen Anne's Gate, Ministry of Justice), London, Fitzroy Robinson & Partners with Basil Spence (1976)
 Royal National Theatre, London, (Sir Denys Lasdun (1969–76)
 Greyfriars bus station, Northampton (1976); Demolished in 2015
 Institute of Education building, London, Sir Denys Lasdun (1970–76); grade II* listed
 Brighton Centre, Brighton (1977)
 Alexandra Road Estate, London, Neave Brown of Camden Architects' Department (1972–78); grade II* listed
 Sampson House, Southwark, London, Fitzroy Robinson & Partners (1979); Demolished in 2018

Northern Ireland 
 Ulster Museum, Botanic Gardens, Belfast, (1964–1972)

Scotland 
 Cables Wynd House, Leith, (1962)
 Netherdale football stadium, Galashiels, Scottish Borders, Scotland, (Peter Womersley, 1963)
 Cumbernauld Town Centre, Cumbernauld, Scotland (1963–1967) (partially demolished 2001)
 St. Peter's Seminary, Cardross, Scotland (Gillespie, Kidd & Coia 1966)
 Glasgow-Abbotsinch Airport, Paisley, Scotland (Basil Spence, 1966)
 Andrew Melville Hall, St Andrews, Scotland (James Stirling, 1968)

Wales 
 Crown Buildings, Cathays Park, Cardiff, (1979)

Oceania

Australia 
 Council House, Perth, Western Australia (Howlett and Bailey Architects, 1962)
 Macquarie University, Sydney, Australia (1964)
 Macquarie University Library, Sydney, Australia (1967–1978)
 Harold Holt Memorial Swimming Centre, Melbourne, Victoria, Australia (Kevin Borland and Daryl Jackson, 1969)
 Llewellyn Hall, Canberra, Australia (Daryl Jackson and Evan Walker, 1970)
 National Carillon, Canberra, Australia (Cameron, Chisholm & Nicol, 1970)
 Cameron Offices, Canberra, Australia (John Andrews, 1972)
 Perth Concert Hall, Perth, Western Australia (Howlett and Bailey Architects, 1973)
 Biochemistry Building G08, University of Sydney (1973)
 Concrete bus shelters in Canberra (Clem Cummings, 1975 to early 1990s)
 Curtin Business School, Curtin University of Technology, Perth, Western Australia
 Sirius building, Sydney (1978–79)
 High Court of Australia building, Canberra, Australia (Edwards Madigan Torzillo and Briggs, 1980)
 UTS Tower, University of Technology, Sydney, Australia (1981)
 National Gallery of Australia, Canberra, Australia (James Johnson Sweeney and James Mollison (1982)
 Performing Arts Centre, Geelong, Australia (1983)
 Queensland Cultural Centre, Brisbane, Australia, (1985)

Indonesia 
 Wisma Intiland, Surabaya, Indonesia (Paul Rudolph, 1997)
"All of America, and Parking Too". The New York Times.</ref>

New Zealand 
 Moana Pool, Dunedin, New Zealand (1964)
 Christchurch College, Christchurch, New Zealand (Sir Miles Warren, 1964)
 Alexandra District Court, Alexandra, New Zealand (1972)
 Hannah Playhouse, Wellington, New Zealand (James Beard, 1973)
 Richardson Building, University of Otago, Dunedin, New Zealand (Ted McCoy, 1979)

Philippines 
 Tanghalang Pambansa (National Theater), Cultural Center of the Philippines Complex, Pasay, Philippines (Leandro V. Locsin, 1969)
 Philippine International Convention Center, Manila, Philippines (Leandro V. Locsin)

Gallery

See also
 Panel building – many of which are large and constructed of bare concrete panels.
 Panelák – a panel building constructed of pre-fabricated, pre-stressed concrete which may resemble brutalist structures.
 Plattenbau – as above but in Germany

Notes

References

External links 

BBC Open University: From Here to Modernity  - includes many Brutalist examples

Architecture lists